The 1989 FIVB Women's World Cup was held from 7 to 14 November 1989 in Japan.

Teams

Results

|}

|}

Final standing

Awards

 Most Valuable Player
  Mireya Luis
 Best Spiker
  Mireya Luis
 Best Blocker
  Magaly Carvajal
 Best Setter
  Kumi Nakada
 Best Defender
  Ichiko Sato

 Best Server
  Chang Yoon-hee
 Best Receiver
  Monica Lueg
 Best Coach
  Antonio Perdomo
 Spirit of Fight
  Mayumi Saito

External links
 Results

1989 Women's
Women's World Cup
V
V
November 1989 sports events in Asia
Women's volleyball in Japan